How to Swim is a 2018 Israeli short drama film written and directed by Noa Gusakov.

Plot synopsis 

In the last few days of her pregnancy, a terrified mother-to-be tricks a stranger into spending time with her.

Production  
The film was produced with funding from Gesher Multicultural Film Fund and a grant from the International Student Film Festival, as a winner of the "Short Along the Way" program.

Cast 
 Dina Sanderson – Avigail
  –  Tami
 Omry Ashin –  Husband
Gal Macadar
 Irit Digmi

Reception 
In his review of the Tel Aviv International Student Film Festival, Ofer Liebergal commended both lead actors for their performances, and said that their respective personalities permeate the film and provide it with its quality. Film critic Yair Raveh called the film one of his favorites of 2018, called it "enchanting, creative and original", and said it was a prime example of exciting things happening in the short-film genre. He also called it "best film of the festival" in his review of the Tel Aviv International Student Film Festival.

Awards 
 Best Narrative Short Film – Annapolis Film Festival
 Gold Award – Robinson Short Film Competition, Pittsburgh
Doron Halperin Award, Best Short Film – Women Directors Film Festival, Israel
Vimeo Staff Pick

Festival screenings

References

External links 
 

2018 films
Israeli short films
Israeli drama films
2018 drama films
2018 short films